Dolichoderus mesonotalis is a species of ant in the genus Dolichoderus. Described by Forel in 1907, the species is endemic to Brazil and Peru.

References

Dolichoderus
Hymenoptera of South America
Insects described in 1907